HMS Swan was a member of the standardize 20-gun sixth rates built at the end of the 17th century. After commissioning she went to the West Indies, then returned for service in the Irish Sea and English Channel. She then returned to the West Indies  where she was lost with all hands in 1707.

Swan (spelt Swan or Swann) was the eleventh ship so named since it was used for a ballinger acquired in March 1417 and sold on 1 April 1423.

Construction
She was ordered in the second batch of eight ships from on 2 May 1694 to be built under contract by Robert & John Castle of Deptford. She was launched on 13 September 1694.

Commissioned service
She was commissioned on 2 June 1695 under the command of Captain Timothy Bridges, RN for service with Wilmot's squadron in the West Indies. Captain Thomas Kenny, RN took over command on 9 August 1695. Swan returned to home waters in 1696 for service in the Irish sea. On 27 August 1697 Captain William Bloyes, RN took command and the ship was assigned to the English Channel. Captain Thomas Day, RN was her commander in 1699 through to 1700 for service in the Irish Sea, Captain Bloyes reassumed command in 1702 through 1705, remaining in the Irish Sea. In 1706, she came under the command of Commander Robert Clarke, RN for service in the Leeward Islands. In 1707 Commander Charles Howard, RN took over command.

Loss
HMS Swan was lost and presumed foundered with all hands in a tropical storm on 17 August 1707.

Notes

Citations

References
 Winfield, British Warships in the Age of Sail (1603 – 1714), by Rif Winfield, published by Seaforth Publishing, England © 2009, EPUB , Chapter 6, The Sixth Rates, Vessels acquired from 18 December 1688, Sixth Rates of 20 guns and up to 26 guns, Maidstone Group, Swan
 Colledge, Ships of the Royal Navy, by J.J. Colledge, revised and updated by Lt Cdr Ben Warlow and Steve Bush, published by Seaforth Publishing, Barnsley, Great Britain, © 2020, e  (EPUB), Section S (Swann)

 

1690s ships
Corvettes of the Royal Navy
Naval ships of the United Kingdom
Ships built in Deptford